Gibberula borbonica is a species of sea snail, a marine gastropod mollusk, in the family Cystiscidae.

Description
The length of the shell attains 2.3 mm.

Distribution
This species occurs off Réunion.

References

borbonica
Gastropods described in 2014